Diplotaxis (wall-rocket) is a genus of 32–34 species of flowering plants in the family Brassicaceae (Cruciferae), native to Europe, the Mediterranean region and Macaronesia; the species diversity is highest in the Iberian Peninsula, North Africa and the Cape Verde archipelago. They are annual or perennial plants, either herbaceous or sub-shrubby with a woody base. The flowers are yellow in most species, but are white in Diplotaxis erucoides and violet in Diplotaxis acris. Some species, such as Diplotaxis tenuifolia and Diplotaxis muralis, have been historically used as leaf vegetables, are similar to Eruca sativa in their peppery flavour, and are used interchangeably with it.

Species
Diplotaxis contains the following species:

Diplotaxis acris (Forssk.) Boiss.
Diplotaxis antoniensis Rustan
Diplotaxis assurgens (Delile) Thell.
Diplotaxis berthautii Braun-Blanq. & Maire
Diplotaxis brachycarpa Godron
Diplotaxis brevisiliqua (Coss.) Mart.-Laborde
Diplotaxis catholica (L.) DC.
Diplotaxis cretacea Kolov
Diplotaxis erucoides (L.) DC. – white wall-rocket
Diplotaxis glauca (J.A.Schmidt) O.E.Schulz
Diplotaxis gorgadensis Rustan
Diplotaxis gracilis (Webb) O.E.Schulz
Diplotaxis griffithii (Hook.f. & Thomson) Boiss.
Diplotaxis harra (Forssk.) Boiss.
Diplotaxis hirta (A.Chev.) Rustan & L.Borgen
Diplotaxis ibicensis (Pau) Gómez-Campo
Diplotaxis ilorcitana (Sennen) Aedo, Mart.-Laborde & Muñoz Garm.
Diplotaxis kohlaanensis A. G. Miller & J. Nyberg
Diplotaxis muralis (L.) DC. – annual wall-rocket
Diplotaxis nepalensis Hara
Diplotaxis ollivieri Maire
Diplotaxis pitardiana Maire
Diplotaxis scaposa DC.
Diplotaxis siettiana Maire
Diplotaxis siifolia Kunze
Diplotaxis simplex (Viv.) Spreng.
Diplotaxis sundingii Rustan
Diplotaxis tenuifolia (L.) DC. – perennial wall-rocket
Diplotaxis tenuisiliqua Delile
Diplotaxis varia Rustan
Diplotaxis villosa Boulos & W.Jallad
Diplotaxis viminea (L.) DC.
Diplotaxis virgata (Cav.) DC.
Diplotaxis vogelii (Webb) Cout.

References

 
Brassicaceae genera